= EORC =

EORC may refer to:

- Earth Observation Research Center
- Engineer Officers' Reserve Corps, sometimes written as E.O.R.C.
- Entoto Observatory and Space Science Research Center
